Shunur is a  village in Bhatar CD block in Bardhaman Sadar North subdivision of Purba Bardhaman district in the state of West Bengal, India.

The total geographic area of village is 360.08 hectares. Shunur features a total population of 2,710 peoples. There are about  612 houses in Shunur  village.

Population and house data

References 

Villages in Purba Bardhaman district